Events from the year 1790 in Ireland.

Incumbents
Monarch: George III

Events
15 March – The Sick and Indigent Roomkeepers' Society is established in Dublin; by the 21st century this will be the city's oldest surviving charity.
Armagh Observatory, founded by Richard Robinson, 1st Baron Rokeby, Archbishop of Armagh, begins to function.

Arts and literature
Emo Court, near Emo, County Laois, is designed by James Gandon for John Dawson, 1st Earl of Portarlington.

Births
1 January – George Petrie, painter, musician, antiquary and archaeologist (died 1866).
15 April – Theobald Jones, British Royal Navy officer, lichenologist and Unionist politician (died 1868).
June – Arthur Jacob, ophthalmologist (died 1874).
10 October – Father Theobald Mathew, temperance reformer (died 1856).

Deaths
Patrick Browne, physician and botanist (born 1720).

References

 
Years of the 18th century in Ireland
Ireland